Guillaume Victorin (born 26 May 1990) is a French athlete specialising in the long jump. He won a bronze medal at the 2011 European U23 Championships. He also finished eighth at the 2018 European Championships.

His personal bests in the event are 8.00 metres outdoors (+1.7 m/s, Albi 2018) and 7.91 metres indoors (New York 2014).

International competitions

References

1990 births
Living people
French male long jumpers
Sportspeople from Montpellier
21st-century French people
20th-century French people